The Tolmer Falls is a plunge waterfall on the Tolmer Creek that is located in the Litchfield National Park in the Northern Territory of Australia.

Location and features

The falls were named by explorer Frederick Henry Litchfield after his late father's colleague in the South Australia Police, Alexander Tolmer.

The site is noted for the large colony of orange leaf-bat Rhinonicteris aurantia, which number in their thousands.

See also

 List of waterfalls of the Northern Territory

References

External links
 
 

Waterfalls of the Northern Territory
Plunge waterfalls
Litchfield National Park